Professional Wrestling Just Tap Out is a Japanese professional wrestling promotion that was founded in 2019. This is a list of their current wrestlers that appear on their shows, as well as their ‘unit’ (team, faction). Other notes included are those of injured wrestlers, honours wrestlers hold, and if they're a freelancer/outside talent.

Roster

Staff

Alumni

 Cima
 Giulia
 Kaori Yoneyama
 Maika
 Mima Shimoda
 Miyako Matsumoto
 Hayato Tamura
 Saori Anou
 Shota
 Tae Honma

See also

List of professional wrestling rosters

References

External links
 

Wrestling
Lists of professional wrestling personnel